Steve Sutherland may refer to:
Steve Sutherland (ice hockey) (born 1946), hockey player 
Steve Sutherland (DJ) (died 2020), British DJ
Stephen Sutherland (born 1990), Australian boxer